Venezuela Municipal Museum is a museum located in Venezuela, Cuba. It was established on 8 April 1983.

The museum holds collections on history, numismatics, archeology, and decorative arts.

See also 
 List of museums in Cuba

References 

Museums in Cuba
Buildings and structures in Ciego de Ávila Province
Museums established in 1983
1983 establishments in Cuba
20th-century architecture in Cuba